Yassar Cook (born 8 April 1993) is a South African cricketer. He was included in the Gauteng cricket team squad for the 2015 Africa T20 Cup. In September 2018, he was named in North West's squad for the 2018 Africa T20 Cup. In April 2021, he was named in Mpumalanga's squad, ahead of the 2021–22 cricket season in South Africa.

References

External links
 

1993 births
Living people
South African cricketers
Gauteng cricketers
North West cricketers
Cricketers from Cape Town